Luis Maria Alfageme (born 17 December 1984) is an Argentine footballer who plays as a forward for F.C. Matese in Italy's Serie D.

Club career
Alfageme was signed by Serie A club Brescia in June 2003. In the 2005–06 season, he was loaned to Acireale. In January 2007, he returned to Serie C1 with Cremonese (on loan), in the same season he was loaned out to Pescara. In January 2008, Alfageme joined Sambenedettese along with former Pescara teammate Gabriele Bartoletti and Axel Vicentini. In the 2008–09 season, he left for Lanciano along with Vicentini.

In August 2009, Alfageme was signed by Serie B side Grosseto in a co-ownership deal, for a peppercorn fee of €500. He played mainly as a substitute but also scored the winning goal for Grosseto in the Coppa Italia and helped the club advance to the third round.

On 15 January 2019, he was released by Casertana.

On 30 July 2020, he joined Taranto.

On 24 July 2021, he signed for F.C. Matese.

References

External links
 Profile at AIC.Football.it 
 Profile at La Gazzetta dello Sport (2009–10) 
 
 

1984 births
Sportspeople from Córdoba Province, Argentina
Living people
Argentine footballers
Association football forwards
Brescia Calcio players
U.S. Cremonese players
Delfino Pescara 1936 players
A.S. Sambenedettese players
S.S. Virtus Lanciano 1924 players
F.C. Grosseto S.S.D. players
Ternana Calcio players
Benevento Calcio players
Casertana F.C. players
Calcio Padova players
U.S. Avellino 1912 players
Taranto F.C. 1927 players
A.S.D. Football Club Matese players
Serie B players
Serie C players
Serie D players
Argentine expatriate footballers
Argentine expatriate sportspeople in Italy
Expatriate footballers in Italy